The Bustamante Industrial Trade Union (BITU, also referred to as the Busta Union) is a trade union center in Jamaica established by Sir Alexander Bustamante.

The BITU was formed in 1938, as a split from the Jamaica Workers and Tradesmen's Union.  It built up a membership of 54,000 within 6 years.

It is affiliated to the global union federation - International Union of Food, Agricultural, Hotel, Restaurant, Catering, Tobacco and Allied Workers' Association.

Presidents
1938: Alexander Bustamante
1977: Hugh Shearer
2004: Rudyard Spencer
2007: Kavan Gayle

References

External links
 Bustamante Industrial Trade Union

Trade unions established in 1938
Trade unions in Jamaica
International Union of Food, Agricultural, Hotel, Restaurant, Catering, Tobacco and Allied Workers' Associations